Nataly Méndez Ramírez (born 13 October 1987) is a Bolivian footballer who plays as a goalkeeper. She has been a member of the Bolivia women's national team.

International career
Méndez played for Bolivia at senior level in the 2014 Copa América Femenina.

References

1987 births
Living people
Women's association football goalkeepers
Bolivian women's footballers
Bolivia women's international footballers